Feelin' Good Train is the third studio album released by American country music artist Sammy Kershaw. It was released in 1994 (see 1994 in country music) on Mercury Records. The album produced four singles for Kershaw on the Billboard country charts. The first two singles were "National Working Woman's Holiday" and a cover of the Amazing Rhythm Aces' "Third Rate Romance", both of which peaked at #2. Following it was a cover of the Mac McAnally song "Southbound" at #27 and also "If You're Gonna Walk, I'm Gonna Crawl" at #18. Also included is a re-release of a duet with George Jones called "Never Bit a Bullet Like This", which was previously released on Jones'  1993 album High-Tech Redneck.

Track listing

Personnel
As listed in liner notes.
David Briggs - piano
Gary Burr - background vocals on "Third Rate Romance"
Mike Chapman - bass guitar
Sonny Garrish - steel guitar
Rob Hajacos - fiddle
George Jones - vocals on "Never Bit a Bullet Like This"
Sammy Kershaw - lead vocals, acoustic guitar
Mike Lawler - keyboards
Paul Leim - drums
Mac McAnally - background vocals on "Southbound"
Brent Mason - electric guitar on "Never Bit a Bullet Like This"
Joey Miskulin - accordion
Danny Parks - acoustic guitar
Russell Smith - background vocals on "Third Rate Romance"
Jo-El Sonnier - accordion
Cindy Richardson Walker - background vocals
Dennis Wilson - background vocals
Lonnie Wilson - drums on "Never Bit a Bullet Like This"
Curtis Young - background vocals
Reggie Young - electric guitar

Strings by The Nashville String Machine conducted by Carl Gorodetzky

Chart performance

References

1994 albums
Sammy Kershaw albums
Mercury Nashville albums
Albums produced by Buddy Cannon
Albums produced by Norro Wilson